{{Album ratings
| rev1 =  Allmusic
| rev1Score =   
| rev2 = Billboard
| rev2Score = (favourable)<ref>Billboard, 8 August 1992 issue, p. 50</ref>
| rev3 = Drowned in Sound| rev3Score = 9/10
| rev4 = Encyclopedia of Popular Music| rev4Score = 
| rev5 = Select| rev5Score = 
}}1992 – The Love Album is an album by English band Carter the Unstoppable Sex Machine. Released on Chrysalis Records, following the demise of Rough Trade Records, the album achieved commercial success and became the band's first and only Number 1 album on the UK Albums Chart. It also contained their only Top 10 hit, "The Only Living Boy in New Cross", which reached No. 7 on the UK Singles Chart. The album also included two further singles, "Do Re Me So Far So Good" (UK No. 22) and "The Impossible Dream" (UK No. 21). An earlier single, "After the Watershed" (UK No. 11) was originally planned to be included on the album, but due to an injunction from the publishers of The Rolling Stones over a line in the lyrics quoted from their single "Ruby Tuesday"), the band had to credit the composition to Morrison / Carter / Richards / Jagger. It was omitted from the album as they would otherwise have had to forgo publishing royalties for every copy of the album sold.

A deluxe edition was released in 2012, featuring all of the B-sides, the "After the Watershed (Early Learning the Hard Way)" single reinserted into the original running order, a song from NME's Ruby Trax compilation and live recordings from a performance at the Féile Festival, 31 July 1992.

The album was ranked at No. 32 in NME's list of the top 50 "Albums of the Year" in 1992.

Track listing
All songs written and composed by Morrison and Carter, except where indicated.

Original release (1992)

Deluxe edition (2012)

Disc two notes
 Tracks 1-3 from "After the Watershed" Single (October 1991)
 Tracks 4 and 5 from "The Only Living Boy In New Cross" single
 Tracks 6-8 from "Do Re Me, So Far So Good" single
 Tracks 9-11 from "The Impossible Dream" single 
 Track 12 from Ruby Trax'' compilation (October 1992) 
 Tracks 13-21 were recorded live at the Féile Festival, 31 July 1992

Personnel
 Jim "Jim Bob" Morrison - performer
 Les "Fruitbat" Carter - performer
 Sex Machine - producer
 Simon Painter - producer, engineer
 Kevin Metcalf - mastering (at the Townhouse)
 Carter EEC - sleeve design
 Andy G - sleeve design
 Stuart D - sleeve design

Charts

References

 

1992 albums
Carter the Unstoppable Sex Machine albums
Chrysalis Records albums